İskenderunspor is a defunct sports club based in İskenderun, Turkey. In 2009 a phoenix club called İskenderunspor 1967 was founded continuing its traditions. Another club İskenderun FK was renamed to İskenderunspor in 2021.

Stadium
The team used to play at the 12400 capacity 5 Temmuz Stadium.

League participations
 TFF First League: 1971–1978, 1980–1990, 1991–1993, 1996–1997
 TFF Second League: 1967–1971, 1978–1979, 1990–1991, 1993–1996, 1997–2001
 TFF Third League: 2001–2002
 Hatay Amateur Leagues: 1979–1980, 2002–2006

League performances

References

External links
İskenderunspor on TFF.org

1967 establishments in Turkey
2006 disestablishments in Turkey
Association football clubs established in 1967
Sports clubs disestablished in 2006
Association football clubs disestablished in 2006
Defunct football clubs in Turkey
Football clubs in Hatay